Montgomery is a city in Hamilton County, Ohio, United States, settled in 1795. The town was a coach stop on the Cincinnati-Zanesville Road, later known as the Montgomery Pike, with an inn, two taverns, a grist mill and a carding mill to process its agricultural products. It would remain a rather sleepy hamlet until the 1960s when it became an affluent bedroom community for people working in Cincinnati. It retains its historic downtown with many other 19th-century houses scattered throughout the community. It is currently accessed from exit 15 off Interstate 71 and exit 50 off Interstate 275, and it is the eastern terminus of the Ronald Reagan Cross County Highway about five miles northeast of the Cincinnati city line. The population was 10,853 at the 2020 census.

History
Montgomery is one of the oldest settlements in Hamilton County, almost as old as Columbia-Tusculum. A log cabin was the first tavern of the community; this was a resting place for teamsters and travelers on the main road. In 1806-7 a number of people from Montgomery, New York settled around this point for trade and farming, and named the village for their former home.  The city is home to the Montgomery Inn restaurant.

During the COVID-19 pandemic Montgomery held a "reverse parade", setting up floats in Sycamore High School's parking lot and having residents drive by. The event made international news.

Geography
Montgomery is located at  (39.247359, -84.347556).

Demographics

2010 census
As of the census of 2010, there were 10,251 people, 3,849 households, and 2,940 families living in the city. The racial makeup of the city was 89.9% White, 2.7% African American, 0.1% Native American, 5.6% Asian, 0.4% from other races, and 1.4% from two or more races. Hispanic or Latino of any race were 1.8% of the population.

There were 3,849 households, of which 34.8% had children under the age of 18 living with them, 68.5% were married couples living together, 5.9% had a female householder with no husband present, 1.9% had a male householder with no wife present, and 23.6% were non-families. 21.2% of all households were made up of individuals, and 12.6% had someone living alone who was 65 years of age or older. The average household size was 2.60 and the average family size was 3.04.

The median age in the city was 46.9 years. 25.3% of residents were under the age of 18; 4.8% were between the ages of 18 and 24; 16.7% were from 25 to 44; 33.3% were from 45 to 64; and 19.9% were 65 years of age or older. The gender makeup of the city was 48.1% male and 51.9% female.

2000 census
As of the census of 2000, there were 10,163 people, 3,616 households, and 2,943 families living in the city. The population density was 1,908.7 people per square mile (737.6/km2). There were 3,716 housing units at an average density of 697.9 per square mile (269.7/km2). The racial makeup of the city was 94.00% White, 1.57% African American, 0.05% Native American, 3.26% Asian, 0.10% from other races, and 1.02% from two or more races. Hispanic or Latino of any race were 0.77% of the population.

There were 3,616 households, out of which 39.0% had children under the age of 18 living with them, 74.8% were married couples living together, 4.8% had a female householder with no husband present, and 18.6% were non-families. 16.7% of all households were made up of individuals, and 8.6% had someone living alone who was 65 years of age or older. The average household size was 2.75 and the average family size was 3.11.

In the city, the population was spread out, with 28.1% under the age of 18, 4.1% from 18 to 24, 22.1% from 25 to 44, 30.1% from 45 to 64, and 15.5% who were 65 years of age or older. The median age was 43 years. For every 100 females, there were 93.4 males. For every 100 females age 18 and over, there were 88.1 males.

The median income for a household in the city was $89,224, and the median income for a family was $100,158. Males had a median income of $78,881 versus $45,000 for females. The per capita income for the city was $45,460. About 2.0% of families and 2.8% of the population were below the poverty line, including 3.2% of those under age 18 and 1.2% of those age 65 or over.

Education
Montgomery is served by the Sycamore Community School District which has received the highest rating from the state of Ohio ten consecutive years. Sycamore Community School District also serves Blue Ash, Ohio and Symmes Township, Hamilton County, Ohio. The city is also served by the private schools of Moeller High School for boys and Ursuline Academy for girls. Montgomery lies within the Great Oaks joint vocational school district.

Notable people
Jane French, singer and songwriter
Paul O'Neill, Major League Baseball player
Connie Pillich, Ohio state representative
Daniel von Bargen, actor
John B. Weller, governor of California
Harland Whitmore, economist

Sister cities
Montgomery has one sister city, as designated by the Sister Cities International:

References

External links

City of Montgomery official website
Montgomery Photographs

 
Populated places established in 1796
Cities in Hamilton County, Ohio
Cities in Ohio
1796 establishments in the Northwest Territory